The 2018–19 Marist Red Foxes men's basketball team represented Marist College in the 2018–19 NCAA Division I men's basketball season. The team played its home games in Poughkeepsie, New York for the 42nd consecutive year at the McCann Arena, which has a capacity of 3,200. This season marked the program's 38th Division I season and its 22nd consecutive year as a member of the Metro Atlantic Athletic Conference. The team was led by first-year head coach John Dunne, who took the open head coaching position after spending the last 12 seasons at conference rival Saint Peter's University. They finished the 2018–19 season 12–19 overall, 7–11 in MAAC play to finish in eighth place. As the No. 8 seed in the 2019 MAAC tournament, they were defeated by No. 9 seed Saint Peter's in the first round 68–71 in overtime.

Previous season 

The Red Foxes finished the 2017–18 season 6–25 overall, 4–14 in MAAC play to finish in a tie for tenth place. They lost in the first round of the MAAC tournament to Fairfield. On March 5, 2018, head coach Mike Maker was fired. He finished at Marist with a four-year record of 28–97. On April 3, 2018, Marist hired their 12th head coach in program history, when Saint Peter's head coach John Dunne was tabbed as Mike Maker's successor. Dunne left Saint Peter's with a record of 153–225 over the span of 12 seasons.

Preseason 
Marist entered the season having lost 20 or more games for the last four seasons under former head coach Mike Maker. The team returned all five of their starters from last season, which included Brian Parker, who was named Preseason Second Team All-MAAC. Parker entered the season as the 10th all-time leading scorer in school history, and led the team in scoring last season. Also returning was Ryan Funk, the team's long-distance threat, who came into his senior season having made 185 three-pointers in his career, which is sixth-highest in school history. Even with a new coach, and a completely new staff, MAAC coaches picked the Red Foxes to finish in sixth place in the preseason poll.

Departures

Incoming transfers

2018 signing class

Roster

Schedule 

|-
!colspan=12 style="background:#B31B1B; color:#FFFFFF;"| Non-Conference Regular season

|-
!colspan=12 style="background:#B31B1B; color:#FFFFFF;"| MAAC Regular Season
|-

|-
!colspan=12 style="background:#B31B1B; color:#FFFFFF;"| MAAC tournament
|-

|-

Source

Awards
Following the season, two Marist players were selected to All-MAAC teams. Senior guard Brian Parker was awarded All-MAAC Third Team honors, leading the Red Foxes in scoring, minutes played, field goal percentage, and assists per game. Senior guard Ryan Funk was named the MAAC Men's Basketball Sixth Player of the Year, averaging 11.7 points per game, while making 45 percent of his three-point shots during league play. He was the first Red Fox to win the award.

Statistics

Players

MAAC Leaders
Scoring
Brian Parker (14.9/game): 9th
Ryan Funk (11.7/game): 18th

Rebounding
Isaiah Lamb (4.7/game): 22nd

Field Goal Percentage
Brian Parker (.489): 10th

Assists Per Game
Brian Parker (3.5/game): 6th
Aleksandar Dozic (1.9/game): 21st

Steals Per Game
Darius Hines (0.8/game): 25th

3-Point Field Goal Percentage (minimum 1 made per game)
Ryan Funk (.395): 8th
David Knudsen (.393): 10th

3-Point Field Goals Made
Ryan Funk (79): 4th

Blocked Shots
Aleksandar Dozic (15): 20th

Assist/Turnover Ratio (minimum 3 assists/game)
Brian Parker (1.1): 7th

Offensive Rebounds
Tobias Sjoberg (43): 18th
Isaiah Lamb (41): 20th

Minutes Played
Brian Parker (28.5/game): 22nd
Ryan Funk (27.8/game): 23rd

To qualify, players must have appeared in 75% of team's games.

See also
 2018–19 Marist Red Foxes women's basketball team

References

Marist Red Foxes men's basketball seasons
Marist Red Foxes
Marist Red Foxes men's basketball team
Marist Red Foxes men's basketball team